Oleksandr Stoyka (16 October 1890 – 31 May 1943) was a Ruthenian Greek Catholic hierarch. He was bishop of the Ruthenian Catholic Eparchy of Mukacheve from 1932 to 1943.

Born in Karachyn, Austria-Hungary (present day – Ukraine) in 1890, he was ordained a priest on 17 December 1916. He was appointed the Bishop by the Holy See on 3 May 1932. He was consecrated to the Episcopate on 12 July 1932. The principal consecrator was Blessed Bishop Pavel Peter Gojdič, and the principal co-consecrators were Bishop Józef Cársky and Bishop Ivan Bucko.

He died in Uzhhorod on 31 May 1943.

References 

1890 births
1943 deaths
20th-century Eastern Catholic bishops
Ruthenian Catholic bishops
People from Zakarpattia Oblast